The White Horse Inn is a 1952 West German musical film directed by Willi Forst and starring Johanna Matz, Johannes Heesters and Walter Müller. It is based on the operetta The White Horse Inn and is part of the operetta film genre.

It was shot in studios in Munich and on location around Lake Kochel in southern Bavaria. The film's sets were designed by Kurt Herlth, Robert Herlth and Willy Schatz. Paula Wessely was originally intended to star, but because she was unavailable, the lead role was rewritten for Johanna Matz.

Cast
 Johanna Matz as Josepha
 Johannes Heesters as Dr. Siedler
 Walter Müller as Leopold
 Rudolf Forster as Kaiser Franz Josef
 Paul Westermeier as Giesecke
 Marianne Wischmann as Ottilie Giesecke
 Sepp Nigg as Prof. Hinzelmann
 Ingrid Pan as Klärchen Hinzelmann
 Ulrich Beiger as Sigismund
 Klaus Pohl as Bettler Loidl
 Walter Koch as Piccolo Gustl
 Alfred Pongratz as Bürgermeister
 Meggie Rehrl-Hentze as Französische Braut
 Jean Gargoet as Französischer Bräutigam

References

Bibliography
 Hake, Sabine. German National Cinema. Routledge, 2013.

External links

1952 films
1952 musical comedy films
1952 romantic comedy films
German musical comedy films
German romantic comedy films
West German films
1950s German-language films
Films directed by Willi Forst
Remakes of German films
Films set in Austria
Films set in the 1900s
Operetta films
Films based on operettas
German films based on plays
Films based on adaptations
Films set in restaurants
Gloria Film films
Cultural depictions of Franz Joseph I of Austria
1950s romantic musical films
German romantic musical films
Films scored by Robert Stolz
Films scored by Ralph Benatzky
1950s German films